Punak is an upper-class neighborhood in north Tehran, the capital city of Iran.
The name of one of the most expensive and promising neighborhoods in the city of Tehran, located in the northwest.  Part of it is in Region 2 and another part is in District 5.  According to the latest census, around 22,000 people reside in Punak.

References

Neighbourhoods in District 2, Tehran